Route 115 is a  south–north highway in southeastern Massachusetts. The route connects several small towns in western Norfolk County, ending just into Middlesex County in Sherborn.

Route description

Route 115 begins at Route 140 in Foxborough, just north of where that route crosses U.S. Route 1.  Almost immediately, the route crosses the far northeastern corner of Wrentham before passing into the town of Norfolk.  In Norfolk the route crosses Route 1A before continuing northwestward, passing Stony Brook Pond and the Bristol Blake State Reservation before crossing through the center of town near the Norfolk commuter rail station.  From there, Route 115 continues northward into Millis, crossing the Charles River and intersecting Route 109 at the center of town.  It then continues northward, crossing into Sherborn.   Once in Sherborn, the route shortly ends at Route 27, just west of that route's crossing of the Charles River into the town of Medfield.

Route 115 is in large part a scenic highway, mostly meandering through rather dense woods, with the exception being the town center of Millis, which is home to many shops and banks.  Route 115 also passes through the center of Norfolk, a much smaller and less developed town than Millis.

History
The current alignment of Route 115 is the route's second. Between 1927 and 1932, Route 115 was the designation of what is modern Route 9 between Kenmore Square in Boston and Route 122 in North Grafton.

Major intersections

References

External links

115
Transportation in Middlesex County, Massachusetts
Transportation in Norfolk County, Massachusetts
Foxborough, Massachusetts
Wrentham, Massachusetts
Sherborn, Massachusetts